Uruguaiana–Eng. Fernando Mac Dowell is a subway station on the Rio de Janeiro Metro which serves downtown Rio de Janeiro. It is on line 1 and line 2. The station was renamed in 2019 in honour of Fernando Mac Dowell (1945–2018), deputy mayor of the city of Rio de Janeiro between 2017 and his death.

References

Metrô Rio stations
Railway stations opened in 1980